is a Japanese manga series by duo Fujiko Fujio and later Fujiko F. Fujio, which ran in the children's magazine Kodomo no Hikari from April 1974 to July 1977. The manga was later made into a 331-episode anime television series which ran on Fuji TV from 27 March 1988 to 9 June 1996. The series was licensed for Spain by LUK Internacional under the title of "Kiteretsu, el primo más listo de Nobita" (English translation: Kiteretsu, Nobita's Smarter Cousin).

Plot
The series is the plot of a scientific inventor boy genius named Eiichi Kite a.k.a. Kiteretsu, descendant of a great inventor named D. Kiteretsu Saisama, who has built a companion robot named Korosuke. He has friends such as Miyoko Nonohana, a girl in his neighborhood and love interest, Buta Gorira (Kumada Kaoru), a typical neighborhood bully and his friend Tongari, a rich boy, who both often antagonize Korosuke and Kiteretsu (though they are in grade school). It also depicts about Kiteretsu's frequent adventures in time with his friends and Korosuke in the time machine which he built.

Characters
  (a.k.a.)
 An 11-year-old 5th grader who lives in Tokyo. He is an excellent genius student, has a strong mechanical and inventive aptitude, but the one thing he is weak at is sports. He can repair normal machines and invent variations of the Daihyakka gadgets. .

 
He usually wears an artificial samurai sword. He is an invention in the encyclopedia. He was made by Kiteretsu himself. .

  (a.k.a.))
 A very intelligent girl who is one of Kiteretsu's best friends, and Kiteretsu's love interest. She is shown to be Kiteretsu's future wife in several time-travel episodes. And she resembles Michiko Sawada from Perman. .

  (a.k.a.)
 One of Kiteretsu's friends who is the son of a green grocer who loves vegetables. He is a typical bully, but is mostly comic relief. .

  (a.k.a.)
 A rich boy and one of Kiteretsu's friends. He is easily frightened, and a best friend of Butagorira, though is quite often bullied by him. .

 Benzō Karino
 A friend and mentor of Kiteretsu and his friends, as well as a university student.He owns a car  .

 Michiko Kite (木手美智子 Kite Michiko)
 Kiteretsu's mother. .

 Eitarō Kite
 Kiteretsu's father. .

 Kumahachi Kumada
 Butagorira's father.He owns a vegetable shop .

 Sayuri Kumada
 Butagorira's mother. .

 Kōichi Tongari
 Tongari's father. .

 Takako Tongari
 Tongari's mother. .

Media

Manga
Kiteretsu Daihyakka vol. 1–3 (Tentōmushi Comics, Shogakukan, 1977)
Kiteretsu Daihyakka vol. 1–4 (Fujiko F. Fujio Land, Chūō Kōron Shinsha, 1984)
Kiteretsu Daihyakka vol. 1–2 (Shogakukan Koro r Bunko, Shogakukan, 1984)
My First BIG Kiteretsu vol. 1–2 (Shogakukan, 2003)

Anime

The manga was later made into a 331-episode anime television series which ran on Fuji TV from 27 March 1988 to 9 June 1996. The series aired in South Korea on Cartoon Network. The series first aired in India on  Hungama TV in 2007. Later on Disney XD, Disney Channel, Pogo & Cartoon Network. An English dub of the anime aired in India on Cartoon Network. A remastered version of the series is aired on Hungama TV from April 2021 in India. As of September 2016, a remastered version of the series airs on Animax in Japan.

Staff
Planning: Taihei Ishikawa→Kenji Shimizu (Fuji TV), Yoshirō Kataoka (Asatsu)
Producers:
Kenji Shimizu→Minoru Wada→Yoshihiro Suzuki (Fuji TV)
Yoshio Kataoka→Kazuhiko Ishikawa→Tateshi Yamazaki→Yutaka Sugiyama (Asatsu)
Akio Wakana (Gallop)
Tetsuo Kanno (Staff 21)
Script: Shun'ichi Yukimuro, Takashi Yamada, Toshiyuki Aoshima, Satoshi Namiki, Tadaaki Yamazaki
General Animation Directors: Tsukasa Tannai, Kazuyuki Kobayashi, Hajime Watanabe, Nobuyuki Tokinaga, Shōjurō Yamauchi
Art Director: Shichirō Kobayashi→Satoshi Shibata
Backgrounds: Kobayashi Production, Studio Kanon
Director of Photography: Shigeo Sugimura (credited as Yasuhiro Shimizu for part of it)→Hiroaki Edamitsu
Music Director: Nobuhiro Komatsu
Music: Shunsuke Kikuchi
Director: Hiro Katsuoka→Keiji Hayakawa
Executive Producer: Mikio Wakana
Sound Producer: Yōsuke Kuroda

Theme songs

Opening theme songs
Listing includes the song title followed by the episodes and the singer in parentheses.

Kiteretsu Daihyakka no Uta (キテレツ大百科のうた "The Song of Kiterestu Encyclopedia") (90-minute special on November 2, 1987, Mitsuko Horie)
Oyome-san ni Natte Agenaizo (お嫁さんになってあげないゾ) (ep. 1–24, Kaori Moritani)
Body dake Lady (ボディーだけレディー) (ep. 25–60, Junko Uchida)
Yumemiru Jikan (夢みる時間) (ep. 61–86, Megumi Mori)
Hajimete no Chū (はじめてのチュウ) (ep. 87–108, Anshin Papa)
Suimin Busoku (スイミン不足) (ep. 109–170, Chicks)
Oryōri Kōshinkyoku (お料理行進曲) (ep. 171–331, Yuka)

Ending theme songs
Listing includes the song title followed by the episodes and the singer in parentheses.

Korosuke Machi wo Yuku (コロ助まちをゆく) (90-minute special, Kyōko Yamada)
Magical Boy Magical Heart (マジカルBoyマジカルHeart) (ep. 1–16, Kaori Moritani)
Lace no Cardigan (レースのカーディガン) (ep. 17–24, Kaori Sakagami)
Korosuke Rock (コロ助ROCK) (ep. 25–60, Junko Uchida)
Felt no Pencase (フェルトのペンケース) (ep. 61–86, Megumi Mori)
Merry ha tada no Tomodachi (メリーはただのトモダチ) (ep. 87–108, Toshiko Fujita)
Hajimete no Chū (はじめてのチュウ) (ep. 109–170, 213–290, 311–331, Anshin Papa)
Happy Birthday (ep. 171–212, Yuka)
Uwasa  Kiss (うわさのキッス) (ep. 291–310, TOKIO)

Television drama
In January 2002, NHK aired a two-hour one-shot live action drama featuring a CGI Korosuke voiced by Mami Koyama. It was originally aired on NHK Educational TV on January 1, 2002.

Games
 On February 23, 1990, Epoch released an action game for the Famicom.
 On July 15, 1994, another action game, Kiteretsu Daihyakka: Bouken Ouedo Juraki, was released by Video System for the Game Boy.
 A board game titled Kiteretsu Daihyakka: Chōjikū Sugoroku was released on January 27, 1995 by Video System for the Super Famicom.
 Another game was made for the Sega Pico.

Reception
The anime was ranked 31st on a list published by TV Asahi in 2005 of the top 100 anime.

Notes

References

External links

Official Tokyo MX website

1974 manga
1977 comics endings
1988 manga
1994 comics endings
1987 television specials
1988 anime television series debuts
Japanese children's animated science fiction television series
Children's manga
CoroCoro Comic
Fuji TV original programming
Fujiko F Fujio
Gallop (studio)
Japanese television dramas based on manga
Japanese television specials
Shogakukan manga
Shogakukan franchises
Shunsuke Kikuchi